Bank of Scotland is an historic building in Perth, Scotland. Designed by David Rhind, the building is a Category A listed structure dating to 1846. Located at 48–50 St John Street, it has also been a Central Bank.

See also
List of Category A listed buildings in Perth and Kinross
List of listed buildings in Perth, Scotland

References

1846 establishments in Scotland
Listed buildings in Perth, Scotland
Category A listed buildings in Perth and Kinross
Bank buildings in the United Kingdom